The following lists events that happened during 1999 in Sierra Leone.

Incumbents
President: Ahmad Tejan Kabbah 
Vice-President: Albert Joe Demby
Chief Justice: Desmond Edgar Luke

Events

January
 January 1 - ECOMOG succeeds in the battle with rebels in Port Loko.
 January 3 - Reports emerge that refugees have come under attack due to clashes between government and rebel forces in the camps.
 January 4 - The Nigerian-led ECOMOG began attacking rebels near Freetown.
 January 6 - Rebels and government forces continue to clash over the capital of Freetown. The United Kingdom encourages their citizens to leave Sierra Leone.

August
 August 9 - The AFRC rebels release 19 of their hostages.

September
 September 6 - Nigeria announces plans to withdraw their peacekeepers by next month.

References

 
Sierra Leone
Sierra Leone
Years of the 20th century in Sierra Leone
1990s in Sierra Leone